Mathieu Acapandié (born 14 December 2004) is a French professional footballer who plays as a right-back for Nantes.

Club career
Acapandié began playing football in his native Réunion with EF Saint-Pierre and CO Saint-Pierre, before trialing in Metropolitan France in January 2018 with Nantes where he eventually formally joined. He signed his first professional contract with Nantes on 31 March 2022 until 2025, becoming the youngest Réunionnais player to ever sign a pro contract. He made his senior and professional debut with Nantes as a late substitute in a 1–1 (4–2) penalty shootout win over Angers on 8 February 2023.

International career
Acapandié is a youth international for France, having played up to the France U19s.

Personal life
Acapandié's cousins, William Gros and Vincent Acapandié, are also a professional footballers.

Playing style
Acapandié began playing as a striker, before moving to midfield for a long time, then centre-back, followed by attacking midfielder, before finally settling as a right-back at Nantes. He is an offensive full-back who runs a lot and like to relay with the midfielders.

References

External links
 
 FFF Profile

2004 births
Living people
People from Saint-Pierre, Réunion
French footballers
France youth international footballers
French people of Malagasy descent
Footballers from Réunion
Association football fullbacks
FC Nantes players
Championnat National 2 players